KNHM (91.5 FM) is a radio station licensed to Bayside, California. The station is owned by Southern Oregon University, and is an affiliate of Jefferson Public Radio, airing JPR's "News & Information" service, consisting of news and talk programming.

External links
ijpr.org

NHM
NPR member stations
Radio stations established in 1995
1995 establishments in California
Southern Oregon University